If the shoe fits  may refer to:

Literature
 If the Shoe Fits, a 2002 book by Gary Soto
 If the Shoe Fits, a 2000 book by Jaye Carroll, a pseudonym of Michael Carroll

Music
 If the Shoe Fits, a 1976 album by American country rock band Pure Prairie League
 If the Shoe Fits, a 1992 album by Norman Foote
 If the Shoe Fits, a 1979 album by Ronnie Dyson
 "If the Shoe Fits", a song by Brendan Shine
 "If the Shoe Fits", a 1979 song by Hank Williams III from the album Risin' Outlaw
 "If the Shoe Fits", a 2006 song by Jihad Jerry & the Evildoers
 "If the Shoe Fits", a song by Leon Russell from the 1972 album Carney
 "If the Shoe Fits", a song by Waylon Jennings from the 1967 album Love of the Common People

Television
 "If the Shoe Fits", an episode of Adventures of the Black Stallion
 If the Shoe Fits (Alfred Hitchcock Presents), an episode of Alfred Hitchcock Presents
 "If the Shoe Fits", an episode of Angela Anaconda
 "If the Shoe Fits", an episode of Barney & Friends
 "If the Shoe Fits", an episode of Littlest Pet Shop
 "If the Shoe Fits", an episode of Murder, She Wrote
 "If the Shoe Fits", an episode of Notes from the Underbelly
 "If the Shoe Fits...", an episode of The Jamie Foxx Show
 "If the Shoe Fits", a episode of Xena: Warrior Princess
 "A Hard Day's Fight/If the Shoe Fits", an episode of Atomic Betty
 "The If the Shoe Fits Issue", an episode of Our Hero
 If the Shoe Fits (film) (1990), a modern take on the Cinderella story set

See also
 Shoe size, an alphanumerical indication of the fitting size of a shoe for a person